The 2007 Mini Challenge season was the sixth season of the Mini Challenge UK. The season started on 28 April at Snetterton Motor Racing Circuit and ended on 7 October at Brands Hatch. The season featured seven rounds across the UK and one in Belgium.

Calendar

Entry list

Championship standings
Scoring system
Championship points were awarded for the first 15 positions in each Championship Race. Entries were required to complete 75% of the winning car's race distance in order to be classified and earn points. There were bonus points awarded for Pole Position and Fastest Lap.

Championship Race points

Drivers' Championship

Cooper S Class

Cooper Class

2007 in British motorsport
Mini Challenge UK